Thomas Lambert (born 31 May 1984) is a Swiss freestyle skier. He was born in Mettmenstetten. He participated at the 2006 Winter Olympics in  Turin, where he placed 14th in aerials, and at the 2010 Winter Olympics in Vancouver, where he placed 12th in aerials.

References

External links

1984 births
Living people
People from Affoltern District
Swiss male freestyle skiers
Olympic freestyle skiers of Switzerland
Freestyle skiers at the 2006 Winter Olympics
Freestyle skiers at the 2010 Winter Olympics
Freestyle skiers at the 2014 Winter Olympics
Sportspeople from the canton of Zürich
21st-century Swiss people